Erik Nielson Duarte Bonaventura (born 31 October 1996), commonly known as Erik Nielson, is a professional Cape Verdean footballer who last played for Fortuna Liga club AS Trenčín as a midfielder.

Club career

AS Trenčín
Nielson made his Fortuna Liga debut for AS Trenčín against Nitra on 11 July 2020. He was fielded in the starting line-up and was booked with a yellow card.

References

External links
 
 Futbalnet profile 
 

1996 births
Living people
Place of birth missing (living people)
Cape Verdean footballers
Cape Verdean expatriate footballers
Association football defenders
AS Trenčín players
Slovak Super Liga players
Expatriate footballers in Slovakia
Cape Verdean expatriate sportspeople in Slovakia